Bülbül (literally "nightingale") is a Turkish and Azerbaijani surname and to a lesser extent also a female given name and may refer to:

Surname
 Azer Bülbül (1967–2012), Azerbaijani folk singer and actor
 Kerem Bülbül (born 1995), German footballer of Turkish origin
 Samet Bülbül (born 1991), Turkish footballer

Female given name
 Bülbül Hatun (died c. 1515), wife of Sultan Bayezid II

See also
 Bulbul (disambiguation)

Turkish-language surnames
Azerbaijani-language surnames